Leonel “Bebito” Smith y Polo (1909, Varadero, Matanzas, Cuba – 2000, Havana) was a Cuban multiple gold medalist swimmer at the 1926 Central American Games in Mexico City, Mexico and at the 1930 Central American Games (now called the Central American and Caribbean Games) held in Havana, Cuba.

Biography and career
When he was 16 years old (1925), he won the gold medal in the 1500 meter swimming competition at the Varadero Nautical Club, which was considered the national championships in swimming.    

The following year (1926), he went to the  I Juegos Centroamericanos (1st Central American Games) held in Mexico. He won the gold in the 400 meters (6:06.3) and 1500 meters (26:17.7), as an individual and a gold medal as member of the relay swimming team 4x100, along with Carlos González, Alberto Gou y Gonzalo Silverio.

Four years later (1930), he competed in the II Juegos Centroamericanos (2nd Central American Games) held in Havana.  He again won the 400 meters (5:28.6), the  1500 meters (22:22.0), and the relay of  4x100 with Gonzalo Silverio, Cosme Carol and Pablo La Rosa (4:26.2).  He also won a silver medal in the 100 meters, just behind his teammate Pablo La Rosa.

A little after the 1930 games he suffered an accident and had to retire from competitive swimming.  From then on until just before his death he was a teacher and swimming coach. In the 1950s Smith was the swimming coach at Belen School.  The Cuban government in 1999, declared that from then on June 30 would be the Day of the Swimmer in his honor.

References
 Palabra Nueva article
 Somos Jovenes article
 Cuba Ahora article
 Granma article
 People's Daily article
 Prensa Latina article
 Natacion article
 Prensa Latina article
 Enl@ce article
 Pasaje Deportivo article
 Cuba Ahora article

1909 births
2000 deaths
People from Varadero
Cuban male swimmers
Central American and Caribbean Games gold medalists for Cuba
Central American and Caribbean Games silver medalists for Cuba
Competitors at the 1926 Central American and Caribbean Games
Competitors at the 1930 Central American and Caribbean Games
Central American and Caribbean Games medalists in swimming